Jalan Ampang or Ampang Road (Selangor state route B31) is a major road in Klang Valley region, Selangor and Federal Territory of Kuala Lumpur, Malaysia. Built in the 1880s, it is one of the oldest roads in the Klang Valley. It is a main road to Ampang Jaya and is easily accessible from Jalan Tun Razak or Jalan Ulu Klang (now part of the Kuala Lumpur Middle Ring Road 2 Route 28) from the Hulu Kelang or Setapak direction. It is also accessible from Cheras through Jalan Shamelin, from Jalan Tun Razak through Jalan Kampung Pandan via Taman Cempaka, from Kampung Pandan through Jalan Kampung Pandan Dalam via Taman Nirwana, from the Kuala Lumpur Middle Ring Road 2 via Pandan Indah & Taman Kencana and from Hulu Langat town through the mountain pass. Wangsa Maju, Setapak, central Kuala Lumpur, Ampang Park and Salak South surround Ampang. Jalan Ampang became the backbone of the road system linking Ampang to Kuala Lumpur before being surpassed by the Ampang–Kuala Lumpur Elevated Highway (AKLEH) , in 2001.

History

Kuala Lumpur was founded in 1857 at the confluence of the Sungei Lumpur (now Gombak River) and the Klang River, which now houses the Kuala Lumpur Jamek Mosque. In 1849, Raja Abdullah acquired large sum of money from Chee Yam Chuan and other merchants from Malacca to start operation of tin mines in Ampang, granted by Sultan Muhammad. This soon attracted other Chinese shopkeepers which led to turning the isolated jungle settlement into a small town, of which Ampang, one of the earliest areas in the Klang Valley, opened for tin mining.

Ampang Road, as it was called then, has existed since the 1880s. It is one of Kuala Lumpur's earliest roads, leading from the tin mining village of Ampang to the heart of the city along the Ampang River. The road was widened in 1888 by G. T. Tickell, the then chairman of the Kuala Lumpur Sanitary Board. In Kuala Lumpur, the street then led on to Ampang Street (now known as Leboh Ampang) to its Chinese shophouses and the Malay village of Kampung Rawa (today known as Kampung Baru).

The old Ampang Road also housed the Selangor Turf Club (present grounds of the Petronas Twin Towers) and the Griffin Inn (an old colonial bar and night-club). Adjoining and across from these properties, the houses and land were owned by Loke Chow Kit. The latter (owner of Chow Kit & Co, a department store) had his country-residence at the corner of Ampang Road and Treacher Road. Other notables who lived on Ampang Road were the families of Choo Kia Peng and Chan Chin Mun and The Bok and The Khoo families.

Pekan Ampang
Pekan Ampang, the historical town centre of Ampang Jaya, is situated approximately 3 km from Kampung Lembah Jaya small village. The architecture of the town shares similarities with most towns and cities elsewhere in Malaya during the British colonial period. Pekan Ampang is still administratively a separate town, falling under the Ampang Jaya Municipal Council, but it was often included as part of the metropolitan area of Kuala Lumpur.

Features

Notable features
Pekan Ampang and Pekan Batu Ampat Ampang, a town along the road.
There are five rapid transit stations along this road going west to east:  Dang Wangi LRT station,  KLCC LRT station,  Ampang Park LRT station,  Ampang Park MRT station (Not yet opened)  and  Ampang LRT station.
Jalan Ampang Muslim Cemetery

Major landmarks along the road

 3rdNvenue Neu Suites near to Korean Embassy (Embassy Row) (KLCC)
 Great Eastern Mall
Petronas Twin Towers at Kuala Lumpur City Centre (KLCC)
Menara Citibank
Empire Tower
M Suites 283 Jalan Ampang
Menara Great Eastern
Wisma Denmark
Suria KLCC
The Dharma Realm Guan Yin Monastery
Several shopping malls such as the Ampang Park, City Square, Suria KLCC and Great Eastern Mall are located along the road which also include Zouk Nightclub
M-City Jalan Ampang
Gleneagles Hospital Kuala Lumpur

Maintenance
In Kuala Lumpur, the roads are maintained by Dewan Bandaraya Kuala Lumpur or Kuala Lumpur City Hall (DBKL). In Selangor side, the roads are maintained by the Malaysian Public Works Department (JKR) and Majlis Perbandaran Ampang Jaya (MPAJ).

Course
The road generally runs in an east–west direction, starting from the junction of Leboh Ampang and Jalan Gereja in the Masjid Jamek area. The road continues northeastward, passing Bukit Nanas on the north side of the hill and following the Klang River until Dang Wangi, where the river turns north. The road keeps running eastward past Wisma Denmark and the Petronas Twin Towers, past embassy row until it reaches the eastern KL suburb of Ampang.

List of junctions

References

See also
 Ampang–Kuala Lumpur Elevated Highway

Roads in Selangor
Roads in Kuala Lumpur